David Dickson Rogers (June 10, 1845 – January 28, 1915) was a Canadian politician in the province of Ontario.

Born in County Monaghan, Ireland, his parents emigrated to Canada when he was an infant and settled in Prince Edward County, Upper Canada. Rogers was educated at the Kingston Collegiate Institute. A farmer, he settled in Frontenac County, Ontario. He was a Director and President of the Farmers' Institute and Agricultural Association. A member of the popular farmer-based Patrons of Industry, he faced no opposition and was acclaimed to the House of Commons of Canada for the electoral district of Frontenac in the 1896 federal election. He ran in the 1900 election as an independent candidate and was defeated.

References
 
 

1845 births
1915 deaths
Irish emigrants to pre-Confederation Ontario
Members of the House of Commons of Canada from Ontario
Patrons of Industry MPs
Politicians from County Monaghan
Immigrants to Upper Canada